Abdel Hamid Yacout was an Egyptian weightlifter. He competed in the men's bantamweight event at the 1948 Summer Olympics.

References

External links

Year of birth missing
Year of death missing
Egyptian male weightlifters
Olympic weightlifters of Egypt
Weightlifters at the 1948 Summer Olympics